Luke Drone (born December 18, 1984) is a former American football quarterback. He was signed by the Buffalo Bills as an undrafted free agent in 2008. He played college football at Illinois State.

Early years 
Drone attended Mt. Carmel High School, Illinois,  and was a four-year starter in baseball and a three-year starter in football and basketball. As a senior, he threw 30 TDs and passed for over 2,000 yards, while rushing for over 1,000 yards with 15 TDs. Drone was a First-team All-State selection and was academic All-State as well. He was voted the conference MVP as his team posted a 25-3 record during his junior and senior years, finishing as the state runner-up both seasons. As a junior, Drone passed for over 1,900 yards and 22 touchdowns. He averaged 17 points per game his senior season in basketball, while hitting .400 at the plate in his final year as a prep.

College career 
As a senior at Illinois State Drone  completed 192 passes for 2,222 yards and 18 touchdowns. In 2006 Drone was a First-team All-Gateway selection after starting every game at quarterback. He completed 203 passes for 2,961 yards and 19 touchdowns.
The prior season, 2005, he was an honorable mention All-Gateway selection and started all 11 games at quarterback as a sophomore. He passed for 2,930 yards and  22 touchdown passes In 2004, he played in seven games and completed one pass on two attempts for 10 yards.

Professional career 
Drone was signed by the Buffalo Bills as an undrafted free agent in 2008 (practice squad). He signed with the Peoria Pirates of the a2f for the 2009 season
 
 Drone now coaches football for the El Paso-Gridley titans in (El Paso, Illinois

References

External links
Illinois State Redbirds bio

1984 births
Living people
American football quarterbacks
Illinois State Redbirds football players
Buffalo Bills players
Peoria Pirates players
Sportspeople from Evansville, Indiana
Players of American football from Indiana
Dallas Vigilantes players
Chicago Rush players
Bloomington Extreme players